Taiga is the fifth studio album by Japanese experimental rock band OOIOO. It was released on July 4, 2006 by the labels Felicity, Polystar and Shock City. It is an avant-rock and experimental pop album that blends numerous world music influences, particularly African music.

Taiga is the first OOIOO album to feature Ai on drums, while Aya returns on bass after her debut on the band's previous album Kila Kila Kila (2003). The songs "UMA" and "UMO" were remixed on OOIOO's 2007 EP Eye Remix.

Title
The English word "taiga" refers to a subarctic zone of evergreen coniferous forests, while the Japanese word  means "(great) river". One reviewer described these as "apt descriptions" for OOIOO's "jungle-like music".

Music
Taiga is centred on percussion, with guitar, keyboard and horn bedrocks being flavoured by conga drums, steel pans and xylophone. While the albm takes influence from numerous global musical styles, much of the music takes influence from African music, with numerous tracks – particularly "KMS" – drawing from African jazz and "lilting African folk-inspired guitar melodies". "KMS" is flavoured by hand drums, jazz rhythms and guitar riffs. "SAI" is built on a sloping beat, patient organ and flute melodies. "ATS" sees the group explore gamelan and psychedelic rock, while "GRS" is a calypso track with heavy drum rolls. "UMA" is driven by heavy tom-toms and rhythmic chanting. "UJA" uses hand percussion in a manner that has been compared to the Art Ensemble of Chicago. Music critic Sam Mickens highlighted the group's "paradoxically formless pop sensibility; while the music's building blocks are primarily beautiful and often familiar feeling (harmonizing guitar lines, Yoshimi's deft trumpet, singing that's rooted in Japanese folk tradition, etc.), the way in which they are utilized and arranged works more in the vein of ancient trance musics or 20th-century minimalism."

Critical reception

At Metacritic, which assigns a normalized rating out of 100 to reviews from mainstream publications, Taiga has received an average score of 78, based on nine reviews, indicating "generally favorable reviews". 

AllMusic's Heather Phares deemed it the group's "most mature album yet", describing it as an "inspired, eclectic mix of sounds and textures" which is enhanced by sophisticated arrangements and effective performances. She also noted the group's "magpie-like" tendency to weave interesting sounds from international cultures "into what feels like world music from an alternate universe". Andy Gill of The Independent described it as an extraordinary album of "uncompromising, absorbing avant-rock" that resembles a "neo-primitivist garage band" playing the music of Henry Cow, Frank Zappa, Faust and the Residents. Cameron MacDonald of Stylus Magazine wrote of the group's "deft" experimentation with numerous genres and noted how the album "continues the band's previous excursions into tribal percussion and cartoon-core melodrama." He wrote that "[t]he language barrier and discord makes the record incomprehensible, but nearly everything is still as intoxicating and entertaining as hell."

PopMatters reviewer Matt Cibula wrote that while the music is difficult, it is "awfully cuddly and adorable" for "avant-garde multi-genre music from Japan". Sam Mickens of The Stranger wrote that, on Tagia, "OOIOO's blissful-experimental-pop-as-hypnosis MO is purer and simpler than ever", highlighting a "a sense of gradual, natural, concerted development". D. Strauss of Spin wrote that the album's "brilliant" nature emerges from its unlikely musical fusions, highlighting the segue between favela beats on "UMA" and Canterbury scene on "KMS", and the mixture of girl group music, Steve Reich minimalism and the Mission: Impossible theme on "SAI".

A more reserved review came from Grayson Haver Currin of Pitchfork, who felt that "in small doses, Taiga is still inspired and moving, sweet even", but that over 58 minutes, the listener "gets sick sampling chunks from two-dozen flavors [of music]".

Track listing

Personnel
Credits are adapted from the album's liner notes.

OOIOO
 Ai
 Aya
 Kayan
 Yoshimi P-We

Additional musicians
 Thiam Misato – percussion
 Yo2ro Tatekawa – drums
 Tonchi – steelpan

Production
 Koichi Hara – engineering
 Mitsuo Koike – mastering
 Yoshimi P-We – production

Design
 Shoji Goto – artwork

Release history

References

External links
 

2006 albums
OOIOO albums
Thrill Jockey albums
Experimental rock albums by Japanese artists
Experimental pop albums
World music albums by Japanese artists
Experimental music albums by Japanese artists